De Langeleegte is a multi-use stadium in Veendam, Netherlands. It is currently not in use as it was the home stadium of SC Veendam which was dissolved in 2013. The stadium is able to hold 6,500 people and was built in 1954, with major renovations taking place in 1998.

References

External links 
 

Defunct football venues in the Netherlands
Sports venues completed in 1954
Sports venues in Groningen (province)
Sport in Veendam
Veendam
SC Veendam